Aciagrion hamoni is a species of damselfly in the family Coenagrionidae. It is found in the Republic of the Congo, Ivory Coast, Ghana, and Uganda. Its natural habitats are subtropical or tropical moist lowland forests, shrub-dominated wetlands, freshwater marshes, and intermittent freshwater marshes.

Aciagrion hamoni, Aciagrion gracile and Aciagrion pinheyi have many similarities; the taxonomy and identification of this group requires revision.

References

Coenagrionidae
Insects described in 1955
Taxonomy articles created by Polbot
Taxobox binomials not recognized by IUCN